Sterri is a surname. Notable people with the surname include:

 Jens Sterri (1923–2008), Norwegian civil servant
 Siri Frost Sterri (born 1944), Norwegian politician
  (born 1960), Norwegian actor

Norwegian-language surnames